Dionisije Njaradi (10 October 1874 – 14 April 1940) was a Yugoslavian Greek Catholic hierarch of Rusyn origin. He was auxiliary bishop (as titular Bishop of Abila Lysaniae) and Apostolic Administrator from 1914 to 1920 (until 1917 sede plena) and bishop from 1920 to 1940 of the Eastern Catholic Eparchy of Križevci and Apostolic Administrator of Slovak Catholic Eparchy of Prešov from 1922 to 1927.

Biography
Born in Ruski Krstur, Austria-Hungary  (present day Serbia) in 1874, he was ordained a priest on 1 January 1899 for the Eparchy of Križevci. Fr. Njaradi was the Rector of the Greek Catholic Seminary in Zagreb from 1902 to 1914.

He was appointed the Titular Bishop of Abila Lysaniae and Apostolic Administrator by the Holy See on 5 December 1914. He was consecrated to the Episcopate on 9 January 1915. The principal consecrator was Bishop Lazar Mladenov, and the principal co-consecrators were Archbishop Pierre Kojunian and Bishop Nematallah Carame.

He died in Mrzlo Polje Žumberačko on 14 April 1940 while making a pastoral visit in the Žumberak mountains.

References

1874 births
1940 deaths
20th-century Eastern Catholic bishops
Croatian Eastern Catholics
People from Kula, Serbia
Ruthenian Catholic bishops
Slovak Greek Catholic bishops
People from Vojvodina

Croatian people of Rusyn descent
Serbian people of Rusyn descent